Singhanavati is a legendary Kingdom was based along the Kok River, in the Chiang Rai Basin in northern Thailand. The ancient Lanna society of northern Thailand was considered more progressive than many other contemporary societies in other regions because the Lanna people recorded their history and social development. Records concerning cities in the Chiang Mai and Chiang Rai basins have proven to be well-grounded and many stone tools have been excavated in this area. Settlements in this region are supported by the Thai north chronicle and the record of Yonok-Bangabandhu, which is about people migrating to settle in this region.

Location of Sinhanavati Kingdom 
Sinhanavati Kingdom was located on the Kok River, which descends from the mountain in Fang District (Chiang Mai Province) and runs into the Kong River east of Chiang Saen District (Chiang Rai Province).

Kururath-Indrapath Kingdom 
  
After a weather disaster, Samantaraja of Pataliputra moved his kingdom to the region of Bodhisaanluang, forcing his subjects to follow him. There, he built the city of Indraprastha and surrounded its borders with a stone wall. Later, his daughter married Kuruvamsa, the grandson of Samantaraja's minister, who built the nearby city Kururath.

When the king of Bodhisaanluang learned of the new settlements in his territory, he declared war against them but was eventually defeated.

Kuruvamsa reigned and promoted both cities, Kururath–Indrapath, as the capital of the new kingdom. He was succeeded by three kings: Sirivamsa, Indravamsa, and Indrapathom.

Umongasela City 
The royal counselor of King Indrapathom, Aya-Uparaja was also the king's uncle and father-in-law and resigned from his position. King Indrapathom assigned Bahira-Brahmin to become his new royal counselor.

Bahira-Brahmin was allegedly dishonest and was banished from the capital.  Therefore, he asked Suvarnamugadavaan of Suvarnagomgum City to allow him to build the new city at the source of the Kok River and named it the city of Umongasela (present-day Fang).

Suvarnagomgum City 
Aya Uparaja resigned as well and went to the new city which Bahira-Brahmin had built. The city was a three-month-long journey along the Mekong River from Bodhisaanluang City. The next ruler, Suvarnamugadavaan, the seventh grandson of Ayauparaja, was assigned by King Indrapathom to rule the city. Later he renamed the city Suvarnagomgum.

Afterwards the city was ruled by Kom-dum, the Khmer ruler who was corrupt and was resisted by the local populace. Due to a flood, Suvarnagomgum was inundated by the Kok River, where now it is known as Wieng-Prueksha. The survivors evacuated to Umongasela City and this district has been abandoned ever since.

Singhanavati Kingdom 
Around 757 CE, Khun Saiphong, one of the sons of Khun Borom of Tai-desa, forced his people to follow him from northern Myanmar across the Salween to this region. The title Khun before his name shows his status as a ruler of a fortified town and its surrounding villages, together called a mueang. After his rule ended, he left no successor, but his uncle, Sinhanavati arrived in 773 CE and rebuilt the city naming it Nagabundhu-Singhanavatinagorn, due to the support given him by the Naga. The new city was located near the submerged Suvarnagomgum City, and forty-five other kings succeeded him.

The Singhanavati Kingdom subjugated Umongasela City, which was ruled by Khmer, and other nearby states to extend its territory. At times it was defeated, such as in the reign of Pra-ong Pung and the royal seat was moved to the nearby city of Paan-gum; a city on the Sai River (Chiang Rai's northernmost district) that later restored its independence.

The last king of Singhanavati Kingdom was Phramahajaijana. During his reign, Singhanavatinagorn was submerged in Chiang Saen Lake because of an earthquake.

The survivors went east to inhabit Wieng–Prueksha and were led by Khun Lung. For 93 years, they selected their ruler from among the leaders of their 14 villages to rule the region. After this period, the records mention the development of high land communities led by Lavachakaraj, which later were the beginning of the Lanna Kingdom and continued through the founding of Chiang Mai City at the end of the 13th century.

La Loubere's Record 
Simon de la Loubère's record refers to the first king, named Phra Pathom Suriyathep Norathai Suvarna Bophit (Pra Poat honne sourittep-pennaratui sonanne bopitra). The chief place where he kept his court was called Chai Buri Mahanakhon (Tchai pappe Mahanacon), and his reign began in 1300. Ten other kings succeeded him, the last of whom was named Phaya Sunthorathet Mahathepparat (Ipoja sanne Thora Thesma Teperat), removed his royal seat to the city of That Nakhon Luang (Tasco Nacora Louang; but Diplomatic guide referred to Yasothonpura Nakhon Luang (Yassouttora Nacoora Louang)) which he had built but the location is uncertain. The 22nd king after him, whose name was Phra Phanom Chaiyasiri (Pra Poa Noome Thele seri),  obliged all his people in 1188 to follow him to Nakhon Thai (Locontai; but "Diplomatic guide" referred to  Sukhothai (Soucouttae)). This prince did not always reside at Nakhon Thai, but instead, he built and inhabited the city of Phetburi (Pipeli). Four other kings succeeded him; of which Ramadhiboti (Rhamatilondi), the last of the four, began to build the city of Ayothaya in 1351, and there he established his court. “By which it appears, that they allow to the City of Ayutthaya the Antiquity of 338 years. The King Regent is the twenty fifth from  Ramadhiboti, and this year 1689, is the 56th or 57th year of his age. Thus do they reckon 52 Kings in the space of 934 years, but not all of the same Blood.”

References

Former countries in Thai history
Indianized kingdoms
8th century in Thailand
Medieval Thailand